Sutton was a hamlet near to Middlewich in Cheshire, England which was added to Newton in 1892.  Sutton's population in 1801 was 30, and in 1851 had dropped to 23.

References 

Villages in Cheshire